Dennis Schiller (born 18 May 1965 in Gothenburg) is a retired Swedish footballer who played as a right defender.

Football career
During his entire career, Schiller played for his hometown club IFK Göteborg, Norwegian Lillestrøm SK (where he stayed for almost ten years helping the side to win the Norwegian league in 1989) and finally Molde FK.

He gained 14 caps for the Swedish national team scoring one goal. Schiller participated in two qualifying matches for the 1990 World Cup (against England and Poland), however he did not represent the nation at any international championship and his last appearance was on 26 January 1992 against Australia, in a 0–0 away draw.

Personal
His older brother Glenn Schiller was also a footballer who came to win the 1982 UEFA Cup.

See also
List of foreign Norwegian Premier League players
1989 in Swedish football
Norwegian Football Cup 1992

External links

Stats at Scoreshelf.com

1965 births
Living people
Footballers from Gothenburg
Swedish footballers
Association football defenders
Allsvenskan players
IFK Göteborg players
Eliteserien players
Lillestrøm SK players
Molde FK players
Sweden international footballers
Swedish expatriate footballers
Expatriate footballers in Norway
Swedish expatriate sportspeople in Norway